"Pictures" is the fourth single by Australian dance group Sneaky Sound System, taken from their self-titled debut album Sneaky Sound System (2006).

The Angus McDonald and Daimon Downey directed music video was nominated for Best Video at the ARIA Music Awards of 2007.

It was released on 21 July 2008 in the UK as the first single, taken from their self-titled second UK compilation album Sneaky Sound System (2009). It debuted at 95 then rose the next week to 76.

Information
"Pictures" was written by Connie Mitchell and Angus McDonald and came second in the Dance/Electronica category of the 2007 International Songwriting Competition.

Cover versions
"Pictures" was famously covered by the late Richard Marsland of Get This radio fame. His performance on his community TV show garnered critical acclaim from the likes of Rex Hunt, Warwick Capper and The Vengaboys, although Tony 'Andrew Bolt' Martin described Marsland's ARIA nomination as going "to waste". Despite such stinging criticism, Marsland's cover became one of the biggest hits that summer in Australia.

"Pictures" was also covered by Tonite Only, whose version was number one on the ARIA Club Chart for 18 weeks.

Track listing

Personnel
 Black Angus – all instruments, producer
 Nick Broadhurst – midi sax
 Miss Connie – vocals
 Peter Dolso – all instruments, producer, mix, engineer
 Sam LA More – remix, additional production, engineer 
 Groove Terminator – remix, additional production

Charts

Weekly charts

Year-end charts

Release history

References

External links
 Australian CD single on Waterfront Records

Sneaky Sound System songs
2006 singles
2008 singles
2006 songs
Songs written by Connie Mitchell
14th Floor Records singles